KLWA (101.3 FM) is a radio station licensed to Westport, Washington, United States. The station is owned by Educational Media Foundation.

While still licensed, the station went off the air in 2008, but returned in August 2012.

References

External links

K-Love radio stations
Radio stations established in 2008
2008 establishments in Washington (state)
Educational Media Foundation radio stations
LWA